The Party of Democrats (PD) was a social-democratic and democratic socialist political party in San Marino. Its counterpart in Italy was the Democrats of the Left.

The PD had its origins in Sammarinese Communist Party (PCS), which had changed its name to the Sammarinese Democratic Progressive Party (PPDS) in 1990. On 25 March 2001 the PPDS merged with Ideas in Motion and the Socialists for Reform to form the PD. In 2005 the party finally merged with the Sammarinese Socialist Party (PSS) to form the Party of Socialists and Democrats (PSD). This led to the split of the left-wing faction, which formed the Left Party (PdS).

See also
Democrats of the Left

References

External links
Official website

Political parties established in 2001
Political parties disestablished in 2005
Defunct political parties in San Marino
Social democratic parties
Pro-European political parties in San Marino
2001 establishments in San Marino